American Public University System (APUS) is a private, for-profit, online university system with its headquarters in Charles Town, West Virginia. It is composed of American Military University and American Public University (APU). APUS is wholly owned by American Public Education, Inc., a publicly traded private-sector corporation. APUS maintains corporate and academic offices in Charles Town, West Virginia. APUS offers associates, bachelors, masters, and doctoral degrees, in addition to dual degrees, certificate programs and learning tracks.

APUS has approximately 110,000 alumni worldwide as of March 31, 2021.

Despite its name and brands, APUS is not a public university and is not a part of the government or military. In 2018, the school paid $270,000 to the state of Massachusetts following an investigation by the state's attorney general into allegations that it misled potential students.

Approximately 56% of APUS students reported that they served in the military on active duty at initial enrollment. About 55,000 military service members get tuition assistance for APUS schools. Another 16,702 use their GI Bill benefits for the schools.

History
The university was founded in 1991 by Major James P. Etter (USMC, retired) as American Military University. Operations began in January 1993 with the enrollment of 18 graduate students. Initially, the main goal of the university was to meet the unique educational needs of military personnel needing courses in specialized areas, such as counterterrorism and military intelligence, that were not included in typical university course offerings. In the early years, instruction was done through conventional correspondence.

In June 1995 AMU became nationally accredited by the Accrediting Commission of the Distance Education and Training Council (DETC). In January of the following year, the school introduced its first undergraduate programs. The first online courses and online classrooms started in 1998. In 1999, all undergraduate classes and programs went fully online, with graduate programs shifting to online in 2000.

In 2002 AMU expanded to become American Public University System and established American Public University, intended primarily for civilians interested in public service programs. In 2006 APUS was granted regional accreditation from the Higher Learning Commission. In 2012 American Public University System resigned its DETC accreditation. In 2016, the university was listed as tied for 58th place in U.S. News & World Report ranking of online bachelor's degree Programs.

In July 2016, long-time President Wallace E. Boston was succeeded as APUS president by former Executive Vice President and Provost Karan Powell, while continuing his leadership role as CEO of APEI to provide strategic and leadership support to APUS and other APEI ventures. In September 2016, Vernon Smith was named senior vice president and provost, succeeding Powell. In September 2017, Dr. Boston was reappointed APUS president after the resignation of Dr. Karan Powell. 
In September 2019, Angela Selden was named CEO of APEI, succeeding Boston who would remain APUS president until his planned retirement in June 2020.

APUS had a partnership with Walmart from 2010 to 2019. Walmart spent $50 million on the "Lifelong Learning Program, chiefly for tuition grants for Walmart workers to 'further develop a pipeline' for leaders".

From 2013 to 2017, APUS' enrollment declined from 127,000 to 84,000 students. In 2018, APUS paid the state of Massachusetts $270,000 after an investigation by the state's attorney general into allegations that it violated the state's for-profit and occupational school regulations, which are aimed at protecting students from the deceptive and unfair business practices by for-profit schools. In July 2020,  Wade Dyke, former president of Kaplan University was named president of APUS.

In October 2020, American Public University began the process of acquiring Rasmussen College, later named Rasmussen University.

Under the 90-10 rule, schools are required to get funds that are not federal funds.  In 2021, Congress closed the loophole in the 90-10 rule that previously excluded DOD Tuition Assistance funds and GI Bill funds. The Veterans Education Project reported that American Public University System would be the largest for-profit college chain negatively affected by the modified rule.

Accreditation 
APUS is accredited by the Higher Learning Commission. In 2018, the accreditation status was designated "under governmental investigation" as a result of an investigation by the Massachusetts state attorney general into deceptive and predatory recruiting practices. The investigation ended in a settlement in which APUS paid $270,000 to the state to provide relief to eligible AMU students, and has agreed to change its disclosures to prospective students, and the designation was removed.

From January 6, 1995 to April 30, 2012, the institution was accredited by the Distance Education Accrediting Commission. APUS resigned its accreditation through this organization as of April 30, 2012.

The university's School of Business is accredited by, and several business programs have specialized accreditation from, the Accreditation Council for Business Schools and Programs. The university's Bachelor of Science in Nursing (RN to BSN) program is accredited by the Commission on Collegiate Nursing Education. APUS' Master of Public Health program was accredited in July 2017 — retroactive to 22 July 2015 — by the Council on Education for Public Health.

Professional recognition and affiliation 
Select APUS programs are also affiliated with and/or recognized by such professional organizations as:

 Society for Human Resource Management
 American Sport Education Program
 Council on Education for Public Health
 National Academy of Sports Medicine
 NSA's Information Assurance Courseware Evaluation
 National Council on Family Relations
 Accreditation Council for Business Schools and Programs.

Academics and finances
APUS is an open enrollment institution. The system employs approximately 410 full-time faculty members and 1,800 part-time faculty members. Full-time professors are salaried employees without tenure. APUS offers 200 degree and certificate programs across six academic schools through American Military University and American Public University, including the following:
 School of Arts and Humanities
 School of Business
 School of Education
 School of Health Sciences
 School of Science, Technology, Engineering, and Math
 School of Security and Global Studies

As well as professional certificates, associate degrees, bachelor's degrees, and master's degrees, the university now awards doctoral degrees. Beginning in May 2017, the university began awarding doctoral degrees in the following courses of study: Doctor of Global Security (DGS) and Doctor of Strategic Intelligence (DSI).

According to the National Center for Education Statistics, the 6-year graduation rate is 29%.

Servicemembers Opportunity Colleges 
American Military University participated in the Servicemembers Opportunity Colleges program before it was disbanded in 2019, with eligible bachelor's degrees in Homeland Security, Intelligence Studies, Emergency and Disaster Management (Coast Guard only), Criminal Justice, Management, and Business Administration. AMU is also a Navy College Program Distance Learning Partner.

Student outcomes
According to the College Scorecard, American Public University has an 8-year graduation rate of 22 percent, with a salary after completing ranging from $15,650 (AA in Human Development) to $76,460 (Bachelors in Fire Protection). Of those two years into student loan repayment, 27% were in forbearance, 21% were not making progress, 19% defaulted, 13% were in deferment, 8% were making progress, 6% were delinquent, 3% were paid in full, and 3% were discharged.

Notable faculty 
Wendy B. Lawrence, retired Space Shuttle veteran and Navy aviator with 25 years of service; professor of Space Studies

Notable alumni 
Monique Marie Chouraeshkenazi, scholar, chairwoman of the National Security Program and Professor of National Security for the Daniel Morgan Graduate School (DMGS) of National Security in Washington, D.C.
Yasser Harrak, Canadian writer, columnist, and human rights activist.
Nicole Malachowski, United States Air Force Colonel and the first female pilot selected to fly as part of the USAF Air Demonstration Squadron, better known as the Thunderbirds. (Master of Arts (with honors), National Security Policy, 2009)
Cory Mills, businessman, defense contractor, and member of the United States House of Representatives for Florida's 7th congressional district.
 Lee Tilton, former Chief, Office of Congressional Affairs (OCA), for the Bureau of Ocean Energy Management, and a former protégé of Chris Oynes.
John Wills, Iowa State Representative. Former Vice President of the Okoboji Protective Association.
Brandon Wolff, mixed martial artist, former Welterweight fighter of the Ultimate Fighting Championship and former Navy SEAL.

Student organizations
Students at APUS are involved in a variety of different student organizations and honor societies. This includes chapters for the National Association for Environmental Professionals (NAEP), Association of Information Technology Professionals, Institute of Electrical and Electronics Engineers, International Association of Emergency Managers (IAEM), Model UN, Phi Alpha Delta (PAD), Student Veterans of America (SVA), the Society of Human Resources Management (currently inactive), Students for the Exploration and Development of Space (SEDS), and The Saber and Scroll for History students.

Academic Honor Societies include: Alpha Lambda Delta, Alpha Phi Sigma, Sigma Beta Delta, Epsilon Pi Phi, Epsilon Pi Tau, Eta Sigma Delta, Golden Key, Kappa Delta Pi, Pi Gamma Mu, Delta Mu Delta, National Society of Collegiate Scholars, Sigma Iota Rho, and Sigma Tau Delta.

Educational institutions owned by American Public Education, Inc.
Each institution listed here is separately incorporated and accredited.
 American Public University System, which uses the brands American Military University and American Public University
 Graduate School USA
 Hondros College of Nursing
 Rasmussen University

References

External links

Distance education institutions based in the United States
For-profit universities and colleges in the United States
Private universities and colleges in West Virginia
Educational institutions established in 1991
1991 establishments in the United States
Charles Town, West Virginia